Pierre Vibert (28 June 1895 – 7 March 1982) was a French weightlifter. He competed at the 1924 Summer Olympics and the 1928 Summer Olympics.

References

External links
 

1895 births
1982 deaths
French male weightlifters
Olympic weightlifters of France
Weightlifters at the 1924 Summer Olympics
Weightlifters at the 1928 Summer Olympics
Sportspeople from Brest, France
20th-century French people